Plouguernével is a commune in the Côtes-d'Armor department and Brittany region of north-western France.

Historically the town is noted for having participated in the Red Caps' Revolt (la révolte des Bonnets rouges) in 1675.

Toponymy
The meaning of the name Plouguernével is most probably to be found in the Breton words ploe (parish), kêr (town, village), and nevez (new), although an alternative suggestion is that the last two elements may be a reference to Kernev-uhel (High Cornouaille).

Population
In French the inhabitants of Plouguernével are known as plouguistes.

See also
Communes of the Côtes-d'Armor department

References

External links

Communes of Côtes-d'Armor